The Arashan, is a river in the Ak-Suu District, Issyk Kul Region, northeastern Kyrgyzstan. It flows north from the Terskey Alatau mountains, near Karakol and Issyk Kul Lake. It flows through Altyn Arashan, a mountain resort of hot springs and forested valley. The Palatka Glacier looms over the river and valley. It flows into the river Ak-Suu, a tributary of the Jyrgalang.

References

External links
Photograph

Rivers of Kyrgyzstan
Issyk-Kul Region
Tributaries of Issyk-Kul